Dimitra Kafalidou (born ) was a Greek group rhythmic gymnast. She represented her nation at international competitions. 

She participated at the 2008 Summer Olympics in Beijing. She also competed at world championships, including at the 2007 World Rhythmic Gymnastics Championships.

References

External links

https://database.fig-gymnastics.com/public/gymnasts/biography/4680/true?backUrl=%2Fpublic%2Fresults%2Fdisplay%2F544%3FidAgeCategory%3D8%26idCategory%3D78%23anchor_41833
http://tomtheobald.photoshelter.com/image/I0000LWrR2fefoe4

1991 births
Living people
Greek rhythmic gymnasts
Place of birth missing (living people)
Gymnasts at the 2008 Summer Olympics
Olympic gymnasts of Greece
21st-century Greek women